Ant Group, formerly known as Ant Financial, is an affiliate company of the Chinese conglomerate Alibaba Group. The group owns the world's largest mobile (digital) payment platform Alipay, which serves over 1.3 billion users and 80 million merchants, with total payment volume (TPV) reaching  in June 2020. It is the second largest financial services corporation in the world, behind Visa. In March 2019, The Wall Street Journal reported that Ant's flagship Tianhong Yu'e Bao money-market fund was the largest in the world, with over 588 million users, or more than a third of China's population, contributing cash to it.

In October 2020, Ant Group was set to raise US$34.5 billion in the world's largest IPO at the time, valuing the company at US$313 billion. On the eve of the IPO, China stopped the process from moving forward. It was reported that the Chinese Communist Party leader Xi Jinping personally scuttled the Ant IPO. On 12 April 2021, The Wall Street Journal reported that under the pressure from the Chinese government, Ant Group would be transformed into a financial holding company overseen by the People's Bank of China.

History

Founding and expansion (2014–2020)
Alipay was rebranded as Ant Group Services on 23 October 2014, and the company changed its name to Ant Group Co., Ltd on 13 July 2020. In 2015, Ant Group raised $4.5 billion in a funding round with investors including China Investment Corp (CIC), CCB Trust, China Life, China Post Group, China Development Bank Capital and Primavera Capital Group. In 2015, the company was valued at about $45 billion. As of 26 April 2016, Ant Group had around 450 million annual active users, with Credit Suisse estimating that 58% of China's online payment transactions went through Alipay. In September 2016, Ant Group bought EyeVerify Inc. and the company was rebranded as Zoloz.

By late January 2017, Ant Group had a valuation of $60 billion. On 26 January 2017, Ant Group Services Group announced a deal to acquire MoneyGram International for $880 million. In January 2018, the companies decided to terminate the deal after approval was not granted from the Committee on Foreign Investment in the United States due to U.S. national security concerns. The same month, the Cyberspace Administration of China stated that Ant Group had failed to meet the country's personal data protection standards.

In September 2017, Ant Group formed a joint venture with Sir Li Ka-shing's CK Hutchison Holdings to launch a digital wallet service in Hong Kong. In June 2018, the company launched a blockchain-powered cash remittance service that will allow real-time cash transfers between Hong Kong and the Philippines.

On 9 June 2018, the company raised around US$14 billion, which the Times of India called "the biggest-ever single fund-raising globally by a private company".

In November 2019, the company announced to be raising $1 billion for a new fund, with the aim to expand the firm's investment activities in India and Southeast Asia. According to media reports, the fund is meant to provide late-stage funding to startups.

In January 2020, Ant Group applied for a digital banking license in Singapore.

Attempted initial public offering (2020)

In 2020, Ant Group intended to complete an initial public offering, aiming to raise $34 billion by listing. This would have been the largest such offering by any company to date, above the $29.4 billion raised by Saudi Aramco as a result of its 2019 offering.

Due to Ant Group's scale—the company has approximately one billion users in China—and its operations, which include lending services, the company has attracted regulatory scrutiny in the past. The China Securities Regulatory Commission previously imposed new restrictions on money-market funds, a move attributed to the size and growth of Yu'e Bao, an Ant offering. Though the company asserts it does not function as a bank or a financial institution, Chinese banks have voiced their belief that Ant draws deposits away from them, so undermining the banking system. The People's Bank of China requested data from banks that lent through Ant in mid-2020 and the State Administration for Market Regulation informally began an investigation earlier in the year into whether Alipay and WeChat Pay, a Tencent subsidiary, had abused their size to hamper competitors.

Several days before the IPO was to take place, in October 2020, the company's founder and controlling shareholder, Ma, made negative statements about Chinese regulators and the governing political party, the Chinese Communist Party. Ma criticized regulators for their focus on risk mitigation. Soon after the comments were made, Ma and other senior Ant executives were summoned to a meeting with the China Securities Regulatory Commission, the China Banking and Insurance Regulatory Commission, and the State Administration of Foreign Exchange as well as representatives from the country's central bank, the People’s Bank of China. Ant Group issued a statement disclosing that the Ant and government representatives discussed "Views regarding the health and stability of the financial sector".

The Forbes magazine published an article that argued that China was right to stop the Ant Group’s IPO, as it was a "dangerous business model" that was going down a systematic risky path that can lead to a repeat of the same conditions that caused the 2007-2008 Global Financial Crisis.

After the meeting, and two days before the IPO was set to occur, the offering was suspended by the Shanghai Stock Exchange; the Shanghai Stock Exchange referenced "major issues" as the reasoning behind the suspension. The exchange further indicated that the company no longer conformed with listing requirements. Ant subsequently suspended the Hong Kong listing. The Wall Street Journal attributed the suspension to the personal will of Xi, who had become infuriated by Ma's comments, citing "Chinese officials with knowledge of the matter", though these assertions have also been characterized as "rumors". The suspension was unexpected, surprising bankers working on the transaction, the broader financial industry, and consumers prepared to invest in the offering. It has been referred to as "abrupt" and "shocking". Ant began working to address regulator concerns in January 2021, though no public plans for an IPO have been announced as of September 2021.

Jack Ma retreated from the public eye after the IPO's suspension. Some speculated that Ma had left China altogether. He did not appear in public between October 2020 and January 2021. In January 2021, he spoke in a live-streamed video. In the video, he discussed his commitment to philanthropy and improving quality of life for those in rural China.

After suspension of IPO (2020–present)
On 4 December 2020, Ant Group's unit and a consortium comprising Greenland Financial Holdings Group, Linklogis Hong Kong Ltd, and Beijing Co-operative Equity Investment Fund Management, have been selected to receive the digital wholesale bank (DWB) licences in Singapore. Ant Group was later ordered by the People’s Bank of China on 26 December 2020 to "rectify" its business and formulate an implementation timetable. The central bank also summoned Ant executives, saying that the Group lacked an effective governance mechanism, defied regulatory compliance requirements and engaged in regulatory arbitrage.

On 15 January 2021, Ant Group announced that it will overhaul its business structure in accordance with the Chinese central bank and its financial regulators' wishes. State spokesmen announced that the Ant Group's consumer finance branch will be regulated as a financial institution, in lieu of a technology startup.

In April 2021, Ant Group applied to become a financial holding company under the direction of the Peoples' Bank of China. The move separated Ant Group's consumer lending businesses, credit card-like Huabei and micro-loan provider Jiebei, from Alipay’s other financial offerings with effect from September 2021. This development dismantled the Alipay super app that serves more than 1.2 billion users. Huabei and Jiebei share approximately 500 million users.

In January 2022, Ant Group launched a new investment advisory service named "Golden Choice Investment Consultants (金选投顾)" in partnership with six financial institutions – Aegon-Industrial Fund, Southern Asset Management, Zhong Ou Asset Management, GF Fund Management, Harvest Wealth, and Caitong Securities. The service was briefly available to all Alipay users before it was taken down less than ten days later as Ant Group does not hold a fund rating license that is required before an entity can assess and publicly share information about the investment prospects of financial instruments.

In April 2022, the company took over Singapore-based payments firm 2C2P to further digital payment adoption.

In July 2022, Chinese authorities give a tentative green light to Ant Group to revive its initial public offering plans in both Shanghai and Hong Kong.

In November 2022, Reuters reported that the People's Bank of China was readying to fine Ant Group around US$1 billion, potentially ending its two-year overhaul.

Expansion outside Asia 
Driven by the growing numbers of Chinese tourists around the world, Ant Group has sought to expand its services into Europe and the United States. In Europe, the company had tripled the number of merchants that are accepting the Alipay app, according to the firm's head of Europe division. Partnerships exist between Alipay and various European digital wallet apps, including ePassi (Finland), Vipps (Norway), MOMO (Spain), Pagaqui (Portugal) and Bluecode (Austria).

On 14 February 2019, Ant Group acquired the British international money transfer services provider WorldFirst for $700 million.

In March 2019, UK's Barclaycard expanded an agreement that enabled British retailers to accept the Alipay app in their stores.

By September 2020, it was reported that U.S. authorities were considering restrictions on Ant Group's payment system, with the U.S. State Department recommending that Ant Group be added to the Entity List, but subsequently withdrew plans to sanction the company.

Services
It operates Alipay, the world's largest mobile and online payments platform  as well as Yu’e Bao, formerly the world's largest money-market fund. It also runs Zhima Credit, a third-party credit rating system. As of September 2017, Ant Group unveiled its facial recognition payment technology through its Alipay services.

In September 2018, the company launched the Ant Group Technology brand for all of its technology products and services.

In 2015, Alibaba and Ant Group Services Group created online-to-offline local services company Koubei as a joint venture . Ant Group also operates credit payment company Huabei, and owns a 30% stake in the online bank called MYbank.

In 2015, Ant Group launched Ant Fortune, a wealth management platform. Yu’e Bao is one of the products on the platform. Ant Fortune offers hundreds of products from more than 80 Chinese fund institutions.

In June 2017, Ant Fortune launched a Fortune Account service platform that allows financial institutions to publish content and sell their financial products there.

In October 2018, Ant Group launched the Xianghubao mutual protection plan that attracted 50 million people to sign on in half a year. Operating somewhat like a collective, Xiang Hu Bao has no sign-up charges and participants contribute evenly to payouts of as much as 300,000 yuan when a member falls critically ill. Such products may help fill a yawning gap in medical protection for vulnerable populations in China, as the rate of critical illnesses rises.

In September 2019, a product within the Alipay app called Ant Forest received a Champions of the Earth award, the United Nation's highest environmental honor, for turning the green activities of half a billion people into real trees planted in some of China's most arid regions. Users are encouraged to record their low-carbon footprint through daily actions, such as taking public transportation or paying utility bills online. For each move, they receive "green energy" points with which they can exchange for the real trees, which they can view in real time via satellite.

In 2021, Ant Group revealed at  the Digital China Summit that it has been cooperating with the People's Bank of China since 2017 to develop and test e-CNY, an official digital currency.

Structure 
The Ant IPO prospectus shows a complex ownership structure with Hangzhou Junhan owning 29.86%, Hangzhou Junao owning 20.66%, and Alibaba itself holding 32.65%. Meanwhile, another entity named Hangzhou Yunbo controls the top two stakeholders, Hangzhou Junhan and Hangzhou Junao, as their executive and general partner. Jack Ma was Yunbos single largest stakeholder with 34%. Three other Ant officials, Chairman Eric Jing, CEO Simon Hu and non-executive director Jiang Fang, held equal stakes in the remainder of Yunbo, with 22% each.

On 7 January 2023, Ant Group announced that it was restructuring so that Jack Ma would no longer be the controlling person of the company. It added that Ma and other nine of its other major shareholders would use their voting rights independently and no longer act in concert. It additionally added that there would be a new fifth independent director on its board; it previously had eight board directors, with four of them being independent. The changes meant that Ma's share voting rights would decrease from over 50% to 6.2%.

Controversies

Connection with Megvii
In September 2020, former Google China president and venture capitalist Kai-Fu Lee said in a public speech that Sinovation Ventures had assisted Megvii, a Beijing-based company known for providing artificial intelligence products to various businesses, in obtaining a large amount of private facial data from Ant Group to “analyze how to enter various industries.” Following Lee's speech, Ant Group denied providing Megvii facial data. Lee later said he “misspoke” on the issue.

Sharing consumer data with Chinese government
In January 2021, The Wall Street Journal reported that China's regulators were trying to make Ant share the troves of personal data in its payment and lifestyle app, Alipay, which is used by over a billion people. The data include consumers' spending habits, borrowing behaviors, and payment histories. According to people familiar with the issue, in the past, Jack Ma had resisted the authorities' attempts to grab the data owned by Ant. In late December 2020, China's central bank criticized Ant for its "defiance of regulatory demands" and asked the company to restructure its business.

Predatory lending
The Ant group had been criticized for engaging in moral hazard and predatory lending. Because the company takes only 2 percent risk for the loans it originates and others take 98 percent risk, it is incentivized to generate a larger number of riskier loans to earn fees, even from those who are unable to pay it back. Another issue was Ant’s model for determining credit scores. Instead of depending on factors like the consumer’s debt ratio or their income. The Ant group relied on a counter-intuitive measure on basing scores on the consumer’s expenditure history where buying more actually led to a higher score for the borrower, and hence encourages more spending rather than reinforcing fiscal restraint.

Related entities

Subsidiaries
	Alipay – a mobile wallet app supports make and accept payments.
	Huabei (Ant Credit Pay) – a virtual credit card type of product that facilitates credit payments.
	MYbank – a private cloud-based online bank that is also one of six state-banked financial institutions to operate the digital yuan in China. Ant Group owns a 30% stake in the subsidiary bank.
	Jiebei (Ant Cash Now) – a consumer loan service.
	Ant Fortune – a comprehensive wealth management app.
	Ant Insurance Services 
Zhima Credit – an independent credit filling and scoring service for individuals.
	ZOLOZ – a global biometric-based identity verification platform.
   WorldFirst – a global foreign exchange platform for individuals and international businesses.
   Shuzi Mali (Digital Horsepower Information Technology) – a software-as-a-service (SaaS) business that provides technology consultancy and software services.
   Sa Si Digital Technology – a SaaS that focuses on software development, technology transfer, and server integration for financial enterprises.

International partners

 2C2P (Singapore)
 Easypaisa (Pakistan)
 Paytm (India)
 Zomato (India)
 bKash (Bangladesh) 
 Ascend Money (Thailand)
 KakaoPay (South Korea)
 GCash Inc. (Philippines)
 Emtek (Indonesia)
 Touch 'n Go eWallet (Malaysia)
 Cheung Kong Hutchinson (Hong Kong SAR)
 Vodacom (South Africa)

References

External links

Alibaba Group
Financial services companies established in 2014
Financial services companies of China
Chinese companies established in 2014
Companies based in Hangzhou
Warburg Pincus companies